ASME QME-1 is a standard maintained by the American Society of Mechanical Engineers that provides the requirements and guidelines for the qualification of active mechanical equipment (QME) whose function is required to ensure the safe operation or safe shutdown of a nuclear facility.

Organization of QME-1

The 2017 edition of QME-1 is organized by the following major sections:

 Section QR: General Requirements
 Section QDR: Qualification of Dynamic Restraints
 Section QP: Qualification of Active Pump Assemblies
 Section QV: Qualification Requirements for Active Valve Assemblies for Nuclear Facilities

Standards Committee on Qualification of Mechanical Equipment Used in Nuclear Facilities (QME)

ASME QME-1 is maintained and revised by QME and its associated sub-tier groups using the ASME standards development process. Work activities are delegated to specific subcommittees as per their established charters.

 QME Subcommittee on General Requirements
 QME Subcommittee on Qualification of Active Dynamic Restraints
 QME Subcommittee on Qualification of Pump Assemblies
 QME Subcommittee on Qualification of Valve Assemblies

References

External links
QME Subcommittee on General Requirements
QME Subcommittee on Qualification of Active Dynamic Restraints
QME Subcommittee on Qualification of Pump Assemblies
QME Subcommittee on Qualification of Valve Assemblies

Mechanical standards
ASME standards